In mathematics, the infinite series 
is a simple example of an alternating series that converges absolutely.

Hackenbush and the surreals

A slight rearrangement of the series reads

The series has the form of a positive integer plus a series containing every negative power of two with either a positive or negative sign, so it can be translated into the infinite blue-red Hackenbush string that represents the surreal number :
LRRLRLR... = .

A slightly simpler Hackenbush string eliminates the repeated R:
LRLRLRL... = .

In terms of the Hackenbush game structure, this equation means that the board depicted on the right has a value of 0; whichever player moves second has a winning strategy.

Related series
The statement that  is absolutely convergent means that the series  is convergent. In fact, the latter series converges to 1, and it proves that one of the binary expansions of 1 is 0.111....
Pairing up the terms of the series  results in another geometric series with the same sum, . This series is one of the first to be summed in the history of mathematics; it was used by Archimedes circa 250–200 BC.

Notes

References

Geometric series